Anna Weronika Bielicka (9 November 1915 – 9 March 2006) was a Polish singer and actress who was known by the name Hanna and its affectionate diminutive Hanka.

Life
Hanka Bielicka was born in 1915 in Konovka near Poltava (then part of the Russian Empire, now Ukraine). After the First World War she moved to Łomża, where she lived until the beginning of World War II, after that she was still very fond of the town and had big influence on its culture.

In 1939 she completed her degree in Warsaw, after which she started to work as an actress. During World War II she worked closely with Polish Theater "Pohulanka" in Vilnius; after 1945 she played in many Polish theaters: Dramatic in Białystok, Cameral in Łódź and others. In 1977 she retired but continued to appear on stage and on TV.

Her first cabaret turned out to be her breakthrough, it is where she met Bogdan Brzeziński, who decided to write something especially for her. After A couple of years of planning he created a character of Dziunia Pietruńska who commented on reality in a unique and unforgettable way. The part was so beloved by the people that it could be heard on Polish radio for 25 years on podcast called“ Podwieczorek przy mikrofonie“ ( “Afternoon tea with the microphone.” )

The most recognized feature of Bielicka was her voice which, by her friends, was often called " the most beautiful hoarseness of the Word"  She was also famous for many extravagant hats ( unchangeable despite the years ) which she wore during her performances.

She also appeared in more than 20 cinematic and television movies. Because her voice was considered to be not appropriate for film she was usually cast in secondary roles.

Death
She died on 9 March 2006 after undergoing aortic aneurysm operation after which she didn't regain consciousness. After her death she was buried in Powązki Cemetery in her family tomb.

Selected filmography
 Ja 
wam pokażę! (2006)
 Sukces (2000)
 Palce lizać (1999)
 Colonel Wolodyjowski (1969)
 Piekło i niebo (1966)
 Niewiarygodne przygody Marka Piegusa (1966)
 Marriage of Convenience (1966)
 Ping-pong (1965)
 Dom bez okien (1962)
 Gangsterzy i filantropi (1962)
 Cafe Pod Minogą (1959)
 Zadzwońcie do mojej żony (1958)
 Irena do domu! (1955)
 Autobus odjeżdża 6:20 (1954)
 A Matter to Settle (1953)
 Zakazane piosenki (1947)

References

External links

1915 births
2006 deaths
Burials at Powązki Cemetery
Polish film actresses
Polish television actresses
Polish cabaret performers
20th-century Polish actresses
Knights of the Order of Polonia Restituta
Commanders of the Order of Polonia Restituta
Commanders with Star of the Order of Polonia Restituta
Officers of the Order of Polonia Restituta
Recipients of the Gold Medal for Merit to Culture – Gloria Artis
20th-century Polish women singers
20th-century comedians
Artists from Białystok